Platanos may refer to:

 Plantain, or the related fruit banana
 Platanos, Achaea, a village in Greece
 Platanos, Aetolia-Acarnania, a town in Greece
 Platanos, a figure in Greek mythology
 Platanos, Arcadia, a village in Greece
 Platanos, Crete, a village in Crete, Greece
 Platanos, Samos, a town on the island of Samos, Greece
 Platanos, Thessaly, a village in the municipality of Almyros, Magnesia, Thessaly, Greece
 Platanos, Elis, a village in Elis, Greece
 Plátanos, Buenos Aires, a town in the Berazategui Partido, Argentina